Jean-Eugène Decorde (May 19, 1811 – May 5, 1881) was a French priest and historian.

Biography
Decorde was born in the village of Bois-Héroult where his parents were farmers. Decorde was ordained as a priest in 1835 and he became the parish priest of Bures (1836–1870), then of Notre-Dame-d'Aliermont (1870–1881).

He was the author of various works, essays and books on the history, archeology and heraldry of Normandy. In 1857 he created a dictionary of the language for the region of Pays de Bray, Dictionnaire du patois du pays de Bray, which is notable because it represents the origins of the French dialect that is spoken in Quebec, Canada. Pays de Bray was one of the major sources of immigrants for the colony of New France in the 1600s. 

In 1861, he became a member of the Committee on Historical and Scientific Works.

Works
 Un coin de la Normandie. Bures., 1846
 Essai historique et archéologique sur le canton de Neufchâtel, 1848
 Essai historique et archéologique sur le canton de Blangy, Paris : Derache, 1850
 Essai historique et archéologique sur le canton de Londinières, 1851
 Essai historique et archéologique sur le canton de Forges-les-Eaux, 1855
 Dictionnaire du patois du pays de Bray, 1857
 Essai historique et archéologique sur le canton de Gournay, 1860
 Conseils aux instituteurs ; réflexions également utiles aux maires, aux délégués cantonaux et aux pères de famille, 1861
 Les Armoiries de la ville de Rouen. Rapport présenté au Conseil municipal par M. Decorde,... sur le projet de frapper un nouveau coin aux armes de la ville, 1871
 Histoire des cinq communes de l'Aliermont : Croixdalle, Sainte-Agathe, Notre-Dame, Saint-Jacques et Saint-Nicolas, 1877

References

External links
 

1811 births
1881 deaths
19th-century French historians
People from Seine-Maritime